The Israel national under-18 and under-19 basketball team is a junior national basketball team of Israel, that is administered by the Israel Basketball Association. It represents the country in international under-18 and under-19 (under age 18 and under age 19) youth basketball competitions.

The team won the gold medal at the 2019 FIBA U18 European Championship Division B.

Participation in FIBA competitions

FIBA Europe Under-18 Championship

See also
Israel national basketball team
Israel national under-17 basketball team
Israel women's national under-19 basketball team

References

External links
Archived records of Israeli team's tournament history

Basketball teams in Israel
B
Men's national under-18 basketball teams